Alderley Edge is a civil parish in Cheshire East, England. It contains 30 buildings that are recorded in the National Heritage List for England as designated listed buildings. Of these, one is listed at Grade I, the highest grade, one is listed at Grade II*, the middle grade, and the others are at Grade II.  The parish contains the village of Alderley Edge, which became a dormitory settlement for workers in Manchester following the arrival of the railway in 1842.  Included in the listed buildings are mansions for the more wealthy businessmen.  In the countryside surrounding the village are listed houses, cottages, and farm buildings.  Within the village, in addition to houses, the listed buildings include a former railway hotel, churches, a school, a bank, a drinking fountain, a war memorial, and a garage.

Key

Buildings

See also
Listed buildings in Wilmslow
Listed buildings in Mottram St Andrew
Listed buildings in Over Alderley
Listed buildings in Nether Alderley
Listed buildings in Chorley

References
Citations

Sources

 

Listed buildings in the Borough of Cheshire East
Lists of listed buildings in Cheshire